Sandhills Public School may refer to:
 Sandhills Public School, Kitchener, Ontario - Waterloo Region District School Board
Sandhills Public Schools in Dunning, Nebraska